Shai Navot is a New Zealand lawyer, former crown prosecutor, and leader of The Opportunities Party (TOP) between 2020 and 2022. She previously served as deputy leader of The Opportunities Party during the 2020 election.

Political history

2020 election

In April 2020, The Opportunities Party announced Navot as their deputy leader. Navot ran for The Opportunities Party (TOP) in North Shore. This was the first time Navot had run for TOP. 

During the campaign, Navot called for tax reform to create more wealth and stop the 'poverty trap'. Navot said TOP's plan for affordable dental care for low-income earners would also improve long-term health outcomes. She also called setting up fruit and veggie box schemes around the country a "no-brainer" and said that community-based responses to food waste (food rescue, food banks, community gardens and compost) were successful models. She supported legalisation of cannabis through the 2020 New Zealand cannabis referendum, saying the current system is not working with cannabis widely available and controlled by criminals, and asking, “Why would you continue with policy that is clearly not working?”. Navot led a group of Opportunities Party candidates to gather at an open home to protest the lack of affordable housing. Navot also spoke about possible solutions to child poverty.

In August 2020, Navot criticised National's calls to push back the election date, following Auckland going into a level 3 lockdown. Navot said her party believed the election should proceed on 19 September as planned. Navot said, "They [the National Party] want to delay in the hope they can boost their performance or undermine the outcome, that’s the truth of the matter. It’s the same tactics Donald Trump is using and it’s dangerous, dirty and unwelcome."

Navot did not win the North Shore electorate, coming fifth with 1,493 votes (4% of votes). TOP won no electorates and received 1.5% of the party vote, meaning that neither Navot nor any other TOP candidates won seats in Parliament.

After the 2020 election
In November 2020, at TOP's first AGM after the election, Geoff Simmons resigned as leader of The Opportunities Party and Navot became party leader. TOP have announced that they intend to contest the 2023 New Zealand general election. 

In December 2020, Navot launched a petition with The Opportunities Party to declare a housing emergency, saying, "The Labour Party has just achieved its best-ever election result in 50 years, and they are the first party to govern alone since MMP was brought in. Despite this huge mandate they are showing political weakness over one of the most pressing issues of our time and one that affects all New Zealanders. It's not good enough."

Personal life
Navot attended Carmel College. Navot began studying towards a Master of Public Policy at University of Auckland in 2017, and will continue this study in 2020.

Navot worked for seven years as a lawyer in both civil litigation and criminal prosecution. Navot initially specialised in pursuing weathertightness claims in the High Court on behalf of the Ministry of Education, and subsequently became a Crown prosecutor in June 2013, where she remained until September 2019. As part of the Crown Specialist team in Auckland, Navot advised on and conducted prosecutions on behalf of various government departments and acted as Crown counsel in criminal prosecutions, including conducting jury trials as lead counsel for the Crown.

References

External links

 Shai Navot candidate profile
 
 
 

1980s births
21st-century New Zealand politicians
University of Auckland alumni
The Opportunities Party politicians
Unsuccessful candidates in the 2020 New Zealand general election
Living people
People from Auckland
21st-century New Zealand lawyers
New Zealand women lawyers
21st-century New Zealand women politicians
People educated at Carmel College, Auckland
Year of birth missing (living people)
The Opportunities Party leaders
New Zealand cannabis activists